The 1933 Southeastern Conference men's basketball tournament took place on February 24–28, 1933 in Atlanta, Georgia at the Atlanta Athletic Club.  It was the first SEC basketball tournament in history.

Kentucky won the tournament by beating Mississippi State in the championship game.

Bracket

All-Tournament Team

First Team
F—John DeMoisey, Kentucky
F—Frank Waits, Mississippi State
C—Aggie Sale, Kentucky
G—Ellis T. Johnson, Kentucky
G—Sparky Wade, LSU

Second Team
F—Buddy Blair, LSU
F—Jack Harris, LSU
C—Buford Taylor, Mississippi State
G—George Pillow, Mississippi State
G—Bill Davis, Kentucky

References 

SEC men's basketball tournament
1932–33 Southeastern Conference men's basketball season
SEC men's basketball tournament
Basketball in Georgia (U.S. state)